Dehak - A Journal For Good Literature (in Hebrew: דְּחָק - כתב עת לספרות טובה) is an Israeli literary magazine edited by Yehuda Vizan, dealing with a wide range of subjects from poetry, prose, drama and philosophy to Judaism, criticism, art and political thought.

"Dehak" is a biblical word meaning "stress" or "push" or "emergency" or a "time of need".

The first issue appeared in 2011 and was accused by critics (such as Menahem Ben), due to its "Maskili" nature, of being too "snobbish and condescending". Later issues were praised by critics, both conservatives (Makor Rishon) and liberals (Haaretz, Yitzhak Laor), as Israel's leading literature magazine.

Among its permanent contributors are many of Israel's predominant poets, authors, scholars, artists and translators.

The magazine has published many interviews with notable personalities such as: John Searle, Charles Simic, Hilary Putnam, Adam Zagajewski, Noam Chomsky, Nathan Zach, Luc Tuymans, Roger Scruton, Aharon Shabtai, Charles Bernstein, Marjorie Perloff, Razmik Davoyan, Paul Muldoon, Richard Swinburne, Rae Armantrout, Dieter Henrich, Daniel Dennett, Richard Greene, Allen W. Wood, Michaël Borremans, Terry Pinkard, Nikolai Tolstoy, Peter Cole, Meir Wieseltier, Roger Kimball, Ya'acov Dorchin, Armen Darbinyan, Tobias Wolff, Tom Rockmore, Robert Stern, Christian Bök, Hrant Bagratyan, Timur Kibirov, Susan Howe, Alain de Benoist, George Szirtes, Alice Oswald, Aleksandr Dugin, Christine Korsgaard, Ron Silliman, Alan Riach, Sasha Sokolov, Paul O'Prey, Vladimir Gandelsman and others.

Dehak is a printed magazine. past issues are available online for free reading (in Hebrew) at the magazine website.

Alongside the magazine operates a small press which publishes Hebrew & translated poetry, drama and criticism.

References

External links
 
 Meet the iconoclast of Israel's poetry world, interview with Dehak's editor Yehuda Vizan, Haaretz, 31.8.2012
 Dehak at the Modern Hebrew Literature Bio-Bibliographical Lexicon

Literary magazines published in Israel